Humans have been writing about the environment for centuries, and the environment has figured prominently as a theme in both Western and Eastern philosophies. Books about or featuring the environment as a prominent theme have proliferated especially since the middle of the twentieth century. The rise of environmental science, which has encouraged interdisciplinary approaches to studying the environment, and the environmental movement, which has increased public and political awareness of humanity's impact on the environment, have been highly influential. The 1962 publication of Rachel Carson's Silent Spring has been regarded as particularly important in popularizing environmental science and helping to launch the modern environmental movement. The emergence of the environmental humanities, including fields like environmental history, has also been important in bridging divides between the sciences and humanities and encouraging further interdisciplinary approaches. The environment also features prominently in much fictional literature.

This page is a list of environmental books. In this context they are notable books that feature the environment as a major theme, including human impacts on the environment.

Non-fiction environmental books
Non-fiction accounts are ones that are presented as factual, although often in the context of subjective argument. Non-fiction environmental books may, for example, be the products of scholarly or journalistic work. The books in this list include fields and styles such as anthropology, conservation science, ecology, environmental history, lifestyle, and memoirs.

Fiction environmental books
Fiction environmental books feature the environment as a prominent theme. Books in this list include fields such as children's literature, eco-fiction, fantasy, and science fiction.

See also
Bibliography of sustainability
Climate change in literature
Earth Policy Institute#Books
Eco-terrorism in fiction
Environmentalism in The Lord of the Rings
List of American non-fiction environmental writers
List of Australian environmental books
List of books about energy issues
List of books about nuclear issues
List of books about renewable energy
List of climate change books
List of environmental issues
List of environmental law reviews and journals
List of environmental periodicals
List of environmental reports
List of environmental websites
Lists of environmental publications
Opposing Viewpoints series
Risk#List of related books

References

External links
Biology Library News: Best Sellers in Environmental Science
eScholarship: Environmental Information Sources: Websites and Books
H-Environment (H-Net, Humanities and Social Sciences Online)
Natural Resources Library - Best Sellers in Environmental Studies, December 2006 - Present, As Compiled by YBP Library Services News

 
Environmental
Books
Environmental